Michelle DiEmanuele, OOnt is a Canadian executive and civil servant who currently serves as Secretary of the Cabinet and Clerk of the Executive Council for the government of Ontario.

Career 
She graduated with a bachelor's degree in political science from the University of Waterloo in 1987. In 1994, she graduated from the University of Toronto with a master's degree in political science. 

From 2004 to 2008, she served as a deputy minister for the government of Ontario under Premier Dalton McGuinty. In April 2007, she was named the interim head of the Ontario Lottery and Gaming Corporation. That year, she was named among the Top 100 most powerful women in Canada by The Globe And Mail.

After leaving her role in the government, she became president of the Credit Valley Hospital in August 2008. She later became president of Trillium Health Partners after Credit Valley merged with the Trillium Health Centre.

In 2012, she was awarded a Queen Elizabeth II Diamond Jubilee Medal.

In 2016, she was included in a Toronto Police Service task force on modernising the service.

In 2020, she was appointed to the Order of Ontario.

In late-May 2021, she was named Secretary of the Cabinet, replacing the retiring Steven Davidson.

References 

Canadian women civil servants
Ontario civil servants
Canadian women in business
Living people
Year of birth missing (living people)
Members of the Order of Ontario
University of Waterloo alumni
University of Toronto alumni